Alexander Ewan Fenton, more commonly known as Ewan Fenton (17 November 1929 – 3 April 2006) was a Scottish professional footballer. He spent thirteen seasons at Blackpool, with whom he was victorious in the famous FA Cup Final of 1953.

Playing career

Born in Dundee, Fenton began his career with Scottish junior side Lochee Harp. In 1946, at the age of 17, he signed professional forms with Blackpool. He made his Seasiders debut at Bloomfield Road two years later, in September 1948, as understudy to skipper Harry Johnston.

In 1952–53, his patience was rewarded when he appeared regularly in the first team. He had established himself enough to the liking of manager Joe Smith that he made the starting eleven for the FA Cup Final.

In 1956, Fenton was named club captain.

Fenton had a transfer request turned down in 1958, but in May of 1959, he was released, and joined Wrexham for a small fee. He spent just over a year at the Racecourse Ground, although a serious injury almost ended his career.

Managerial career

At the start of the 1960–61 season, Fenton joined Irish club Limerick as player/manager, the same season they played in the European Cup. He played in the 1965–66 European Cup Winners' Cup against PFC CSKA Sofia.

In 1967, he moved north of the border to become manager of Linfield. Three years later, however, he returned to Limerick, this time as full-time manager. In 1971, under his guidance, Limerick won their first ever cup, the FAI Cup, beating Drogheda in the final.

In 2003, Fenton returned to Bloomfield Road to attend a 50th anniversary reunion of the Tangerines' FA Cup victory with fellow surviving teammates.

Personal life
Fenton settled in Limerick in 1960 and operated a driving school, "Ewan Fenton's School of Motoring" from 1965 to the late 1990s. He died there in 2006 at the age of 76 after a short illness and was survived by his Blackpool-born wife, Vera, son Ewan, and three grandchildren.

Honours

As a player

Blackpool
 FA Cup winner: 1953

As a manager
Linfield
 IFA Premiership winner: 1968–69
 Irish Cup winner: 1970

Limerick
 FAI Cup winner: 1971
 FAI League Cup winner: 1975–76

Notes

References

External links
 Obituary in The Courier
 Obituary at Norn Iron Mad
 

1929 births
2006 deaths
Footballers from Dundee
Scottish footballers
Lochee Harp F.C. players
Blackpool F.C. players
Wrexham A.F.C. players
English Football League players
Limerick F.C. players
Limerick F.C. managers
League of Ireland players
League of Ireland managers
Association football defenders
Linfield F.C. managers
Dundee North End F.C. players
Scottish football managers
FA Cup Final players